Louis Krebs Graham (born January 7, 1938) is an American professional golfer who won six PGA Tour tournaments including the 1975 U.S. Open. Most of his wins were in the 1970s.

Lou Graham was born in Nashville, Tennessee. He started playing golf when he was seven years old. He attended Nashville's Father Ryan High School, and then Memphis State University, now the University of Memphis, in Memphis, Tennessee, where he played on the golf team for three years. Later, Graham was drafted into the U.S. Army. While in the Army, Graham served as a member of the Old Guard—Company E of the Third U.S. Infantry Regiment—the ceremonial Honor Guard that guards the Tomb of the Unknown Soldier in Arlington National Cemetery. During his Army career, he made the Army golf team that won the Inter-Service championship in 1961.

Graham joined the PGA Tour in September 1964. His first win was at the Minnesota Golf Classic at Hazeltine National Golf Club in 1967 during his third full year on the tour. Graham won again in 1972 at the Liggett Myers Open, followed by the U.S. Open in 1975. Graham had only three wins in fifteen years, and then in 1979, he won three more times in the space of eleven weeks. For this achievement, he won Golf Digest's 1979 Comeback of the Year award.

Graham played on three Ryder Cup teams (1973, 1975, 1977), and was a member of the victorious 1975 World Cup Team. He was inducted as a charter member of the Tennessee Golf Hall of Fame in 1992. During his career, he won over $1.4 million on the PGA Tour and over $600,000 in Senior Tour career earnings.

Graham's greatest success in major championships has been at the U.S. Open. He won in 1975 at the Medinah Country Club in Medinah, Illinois beating John Mahaffey by two strokes in a playoff. In 1977, he finished second – losing by one stroke to Hubert Green at Southern Hills Country Club in Tulsa, Oklahoma. He also had a previous T-3 finish at the Open in 1974. On the Senior Tour (now known as the Champions Tour), his best finish was a T-3 at the AT&T Championship in 1990.

Professional wins (7)

PGA Tour wins (6)

PGA Tour playoff record (3–1)

Other wins (1)

Major championships

Wins (1)

1Defeated Mahaffey in an 18-hole playoff – Graham 71 (E), Mahaffey 73 (+2).

Results timeline

CUT = missed the halfway cut
"T" indicates a tie for a place.

Summary

Most consecutive cuts made – 11 (1974 U.S. Open – 1977 U.S. Open)
Longest streak of top-10s – 3 (1977 Masters – 1977 PGA)

Results in The Players Championship

CUT = missed the halfway cut
WD = withdrew
"T" indicates a tie for a place

U.S. national team appearances
Professional
Ryder Cup: 1973 (winners), 1975 (winners), 1977 (winners)
World Cup: 1975 (winners)

References

External links

American male golfers
PGA Tour golfers
PGA Tour Champions golfers
Ryder Cup competitors for the United States
Winners of men's major golf championships
Golfers from Tennessee
Sportspeople from Nashville, Tennessee
1938 births
Living people